"The Real Thing" is a song recorded by Belgian/Dutch Eurodance band 2 Unlimited, released in May 1994 as the first single from their third album, Real Things (1994). The song is co-written by bandmembers Ray Slijngaard and Anita Dels, and scored chart success in many European countries. It topped the charts in Finland and the Netherlands, while peaking at number two in Denmark, Sweden, Belgium and Switzerland. The song also was a top 10 hit in Austria, France, Germany, Norway, Scotland, Spain and the UK. It entered the Eurochart Hot 100 on 28 May at 30 and peaked at number-one three weeks later. Outside Europe, it peaked at number two in Israel and number 39 in Australia. A music video was produced to promote the single, directed by Nigel Simpkiss.

Composition
"The Real Thing" contains samples of Toccata and Fugue in D minor by German composer and musician Johann Sebastian Bach. According to classicfm.com, it is considered one of the biggest pop songs to sample classical music in the last 25 years."

Critical reception
In his weekly UK chart commentary, James Masterton wrote that this "is just what you would expect from 2 Unlimited. Fast, frantic and fatuous it's still enough to give them an eighth Top 10 hit out of 10 chart singles". A reviewer from Music & Media commented, "In no time, chart positions are reported from the UK, Ireland, Holland, Belgium, Germany and Denmark. With this ABBAesque pop dance chorus many territories will follow." Alan Jones from Music Week gave the song four out of five, adding that here, 2 Unlimited "plough their usual frantic and bouncy techno furrow. The male rap/female singing combination still serves them well and, as usual, this is Top 10 bound." 

Scottish newspaper Perthshire Advertiser said, "They've found a new formula yet, but it'll still be a smash!" In an retrospective review, Pop Rescue noted that "it's clear here that 2 Unlimited were packing a punch with this song 'and we're not gonna stop until we reach the highest top', sings Anita." James Hamilton from the RM Dance Update declared it as a "typically cheesy frantic pop galloper". Tim Marsh from Select stated that it "has a funky key riff". Tom Doyle from Smash Hits gave it three out of five, commenting, "ditching their heavy heavy techno techno for a bit of a housey classical vibe, the 'Limited look set to continue their near unblemished run of chart hits."

Chart performance
"The Real Thing" was a major hit in several countries, making it one of 2 Unlimited's most successful songs. It peaked at number-one in Finland, Lithuania and the Netherlands, as well as on the Eurochart Hot 100. The single reached number two in Belgium, Denmark, Sweden and Switzerland, and was also a top 10 hit in Austria (7), France (10), Germany (4), Norway (5), Scotland (10), Spain (3) and the United Kingdom. In the latter, it went to number six on 22 May 1994, during its second week on the UK Singles Chart, while peaking at number 12 on the UK Dance Singles Chart. In addition, the song was a top 20 hit in Iceland, reaching number 14. 

Outside Europe, "The Real Thing" peaked at number two in Israel, number 22 in New Zealand and number 39 in Australia. The single has sold 633,000 copies worldwide.

Airplay
"The Real Thing" entered the European airplay chart Border Breakers at number 12 on 4 June due to crossover airplay in East Central-, West-, Central-, Northwest- and North-European regions, and peaked at the third position on 2 July.

Music video
The accompanying music video for "The Real Thing" was directed by Nigel Simpkiss and released in the UK in May 1994. The video received heavy rotation on MTV Europe and was A-listed on Germany's VIVA.

Track listings

 7-inch single
 "The Real Thing" (Edit) – 3:40
 "The Real Thing" (Tribal-Edit) – 3:55

 12-inch maxi, Europe
 "The Real Thing" (Trance-Thing) – 6:18
 "The Real Thing" (Extended) – 6:20
 "The Real Thing" (Tribal-Thing) – 5:53

 12-inch maxi, Italy
 "The Real Thing" (Extended) – 6:20
 "The Real Thing" (Spaans) – 6:16
 "The Real Thing" (Tribal-Thing) – 5:53
 "The Real Thing" (Trance-Thing) – 6:18

 12-inch maxi, UK
 "The Real Thing" (Tribal Thing)
 "The Real Thing" (Trance Thing)
 "The Real Thing" (Extended 12")

 12-inch maxi, US
 "The Real Thing" (J&D's Wookie Vocal Mix) – 6:45
 "The Real Thing" (Extended Euro Club Mix) – 6:18
 "The Real Thing" (The Doc & Baron 90 Proof Club Mix) – 7:54
 "The Real Thing" (The Tribal Thing) – 5:53

 12-inch maxi, US
 "The Real Thing" (Doc & Baron's NYC Dub Excursion) – 10:37
 "The Real Thing" (J&D's Clubstrumental) – 4:20
 "The Real Thing" (The It Goes Underground Mix) – 6:45
 "The Real Thing" (The Trance Thing) – 5:38

 CD maxi, Europe and Canada
 "The Real Thing" (Edit) – 3:40
 "The Real Thing" (Trance Thing) – 6:18
 "The Real Thing" (Extended) – 6:20
 "The Real Thing" (Tribal Thing) – 5:53

 CD single, UK
 "The Real Thing" — (3:42)
 "The Real Thing" (Extended 12") – 6:20
 "The Real Thing" (Trance-Thing) – 5:39
 "The Real Thing" (Tribal-Thing) – 5:55

 CD maxi, US
 "The Real Thing" (J & D's Wookie Radio Mix) – 3:51
 "The Real Thing" (Extended Euro Club Mix) – 6:18
 "The Real Thing" (J & D's Wookie Vocal Mix) – 6:45
 "The Real Thing" (Doc Baron's 90 Proof Club Mix) – 7:54
 "The Real Thing" (The Tribal Thing) – 5:56

Charts

Weekly charts

Year-end charts

References

2 Unlimited songs
1994 singles
1994 songs
Byte Records singles
Dutch Top 40 number-one singles
European Hot 100 Singles number-one singles
Music videos directed by Nigel Simpkiss
Number-one singles in Finland
Pete Waterman Entertainment singles
Popular songs based on classical music
Songs written by Anita Doth
Songs written by Peter Bauwens
Songs written by Phil Wilde
Songs written by Ray Slijngaard
ZYX Music singles